Vadim Kapranov (26 February 1940 – 4 June 2021) was a Russian basketball player and coach. He competed in the men's tournament at the 1968 Summer Olympics.

Kapranov died on 4 June 2021, aged 81.

See also
 List of EuroBasket Women winning head coaches

References

External links
 

1940 births
2021 deaths
Russian men's basketball players
Soviet men's basketball players
Olympic basketball players of the Soviet Union
Basketball players at the 1968 Summer Olympics
Basketball players from Moscow
Medalists at the 1968 Summer Olympics
Olympic bronze medalists for the Soviet Union
PBC CSKA Moscow players
BC Dynamo Moscow players
Deaths from the COVID-19 pandemic in Russia